Urban Search and Rescue Tennessee Task Force  or TN-TF1 is a FEMA Urban Search and Rescue Task Force based in Memphis, Tennessee. TN-TF1 is sponsored by the Memphis Fire Services.

References

Tennessee 1
Organizations based in Memphis, Tennessee